Óttar Magnús Karlsson (born 21 February 1997) is an Icelandic professional footballer who plays as a forward for  club Virtus Francavilla, on loan from Venezia. He also represents the Iceland national team.

Club career

Ajax
On 11 July 2013, Óttar signed a three-year contract with Ajax.

Sparta Rotterdam (loan)
In December 2015, Óttar agreed to join Sparta Rotterdam on loan for the remainder of the 2015–16 Eerste Divisie season.

Víkingur
Óttar was chosen as the most promising player of the Icelandic 2016 Úrvalsdeild league by players.

Molde
On 25 November 2016, Óttar signed a three-year contract with Norwegian Tippeligaen side Molde FK.

Trelleborgs (loan)
In February 2018, Óttar agreed to join Trelleborgs FF on loan for the upcoming 2018 Allsvenskan season.

Mjällby AIF
On 15 December 2018 it was confirmed, that Óttar had signed with Mjällby AIF for two years.

Víkingur
On 30 July 2019 it was announced that Óttar had signed with Víkingur until the end of the 2021 season.

Venezia
On 25 September 2020, Karlsson signed a three-year contract with Italian club Venezia.

Loan to Siena
On 27 August 2021, he joined Siena in the third-tier Serie C on loan.

Loan to Oakland
On 18 February 2022, Karlsson joined Oakland Roots on loan.

Having scored 19 goals in 30 appearances for the club, he returned to Venice from Oakland following their 2022 season.

Loan to Virtus Francavilla
On 31 January 2023, Karlsson was loaned to Serie C club Virtus Francavilla until the end of the season.

International career
Óttar represented the Icelandic U-16, U-17, U-19 and U-21 teams. He made his debut for the Senior team on 10 January 2017 against China in the China Cup.

In 2022, he was called up to the team for international friendlies against South Korea and Saudi Arabia.

Career statistics

Club

aAppearance in the 2020 Icelandic Super Cup.

International

Statistics accurate as of match played 11 November 2022

International goals
Scores and results list Iceland's goal tally first.

Honours
Víkingur FC
Icelandic Cup: 2019

Individual
USL Championship All League Second Team: 2022

References

External links
 

1997 births
Living people
Ottar Magnus Karlsson
Ottar Magnus Karlsson
Association football defenders
Ottar Magnus Karlsson
Ottar Magnus Karlsson
Ottar Magnus Karlsson
Eliteserien players
Molde FK players
Allsvenskan players
Superettan players
Trelleborgs FF players
Mjällby AIF players
Serie B players
Serie C players
Venezia F.C. players
A.C.N. Siena 1904 players
USL Championship players
Oakland Roots SC players
Virtus Francavilla Calcio players
Ottar Magnus Karlsson
Expatriate footballers in the Netherlands
Expatriate footballers in Norway
Expatriate footballers in Italy
Expatriate soccer players in the United States
Ottar Magnus Karlsson
Ottar Magnus Karlsson
Ottar Magnus Karlsson
Ottar Magnus Karlsson
Ottar Magnus Karlsson
Ottar Magnus Karlsson
Ottar Magnus Karlsson